Cyril James 'Jimmy' Smith (25 January 1899 – 11 January 1974) was an Australian rules footballer who played in the VFL between 1917 and 1926 for the Richmond Football Club.

Smith also served on the Richmond Football Club Committee between 1927 and 1931.

References

External links

Richmond Football Club players
Richmond Football Club Premiership players
Australian rules footballers from Victoria (Australia)
1899 births
1974 deaths
Two-time VFL/AFL Premiership players